The Wistar Institute is an independent, nonprofit research institution in biomedical science, with special focus on oncology, immunology, infectious disease and vaccine research. Located on the campus of the University of Pennsylvania, Wistar was founded in 1892 as a nonprofit institution to focus on biomedical research and training. The institute has historic and contemporary ties with the university, reflected in research collaboration and shared access to facilities.

Since 1972, Wistar has been a National Cancer Institute (NCI)-designated cancer center. It has received the highest rating of "exceptional" in two consecutive terms in 2013 and 2018 by the Cancer Center Support Grant.

Research

Cancer research
Working at The Wistar Institute Cancer Center spans from basic to translational and disease-relevant cancer research with focus on prevention, diagnosis and treatment. The center is organized in three research programs:

 Gene expression and Regulation Program, focusing on cancer genomics and epigenetics
 Immunology, Microenvironment and Metastasis Program, focusing on the role of the tumor microenvironment and the immune system in tumor progression and response to therapy
 Molecular and Cellular Oncogenesis Program, focusing on the molecular and cellular events underlying cancer development and the role of tumor cell metabolism in metastatic competence

Wistar also maintains one of the largest melanoma research programs in the U.S. outside of the National Institutes of Health (NIH).

Cancer research accomplishments:

 Identification of genetic alterations linked to the development of blood cancer, paving the way for the later development of molecular therapies.
 Pioneering the monoclonal antibody technology and its development for clinical use.
 Discovery of molecular markers for non-invasive diagnostic tests for lung cancer and cutaneous T-cell lymphoma, currently in clinical development.
 Advancements in melanoma biology and understanding the molecular pathways that drive tumor development, with the creation of a Wistar melanoma cell line repository that is one of the largest and most used in the world, with more than 500 cell lines.

Immunology and vaccine development
The Wistar Vaccine & Immunotherapy Center advances new generation DNA-based technologies for prevention of infectious diseases and for cancer immunotherapy.

The HIV-1 research program at Wistar is co-leading a consortium of 30 of the nation's top HIV investigators, which in 2016 received a nearly $23 million grant from the National Institutes of Health for HIV cure research, to test combinations of novel immunotherapies in clinical trials.

Discoveries at Wistar have led to the creation of vaccines that protect children and adults from widespread, debilitating, and life-threatening diseases and have saved countless lives in the U.S. and abroad:

 A vaccine against rubella (German measles) developed in 1969 at Wistar has been successfully used worldwide since the 1970s and is administered in the U.S. as part of the measles, mumps and rubella (MMR) combination vaccine. The Wistar-developed vaccine led the charge in the eradication of rubella, which was declared eradicated in the U.S. in 2004.
 Two rabies vaccines were developed at Wistar and are used worldwide to prevent rabies-related deaths in humans and wildlife. One is administered as a post-exposure treatment and is nearly 100% effective in preventing fatal rabies infection. It is also given to people at high risk of exposure, including veterinarians and wildlife officers. This vaccine, which was developed at Wistar in 1960 through late 1970's, has helped to make rabies-related human death a rarity in the U.S. Along with many other countries. Another Wistar vaccine, licensed in 1995, is used to prevent rabies infection in wildlife.
 Wistar scientists are co-creators of a rotavirus vaccine that was licensed by the Food and Drug Administration in 2016, and is routinely administered in the United States and around the world. The rotavirus vaccine contributes to saving U.S. children from 250,000 emergency room visits and 70,000 hospitalizations each year.
 Wistar contributed technology critical to the development of the first vaccine for the Zika virus approved by the U.S. Food and Drug Administration to be tested in humans.
 Wistar created vaccine candidate against Powassan virus.

Education and training
The institute offers several programs for education and training.

 Postdoctoral program: Postdoctoral students at Wistar carry out research under the mentorship of one of the faculty members. Funding is sourced from two different NIH training grants at Wistar. There are several awards for trainee excellence.
 Graduate programs: Doctoral training at Wistar can be pursued through the University of Pennsylvania and the Cancer Biology Graduate Program, which is jointly overseen by the University of the Sciences and Wistar.
 Biomedical Technician Training Program: The program, jointly developed by Wistar and Community College of Philadelphia (CCP), is aimed towards community college students looking for new career opportunities as research assistants and technicians. It combines academic course work at CCP (College Credit Plus) with laboratory training at the institute and other affiliated research institutes.
 Biomedical Research Technician Apprenticeship: A program primarily geared towards students interested in becoming biomedical research technicians in a research laboratory environment.
 High School Fellowship in Biomedical Research: A program in which High School students may assist researchers in the lab.

History

Beginnings

The Wistar Institute of Anatomy and Biology was named for Dr. Caspar Wistar (1761-1818), a prominent Philadelphia physician, and chair of the anatomy department at the University of Pennsylvania. He wrote and published the first American textbook on anatomy—A System of Anatomy: Volume 1 (1811), Volume 2 (1814).

To augment his medical lectures and illustrate comparative anatomy, Dr. Wistar began collecting dried, wax-injected, preserved human specimens. Two years prior to his death in 1818, he gave the collection to Dr. William Edmonds Horner, another Philadelphia physician. Dr. Horner expanded the collection, which became known as the Wistar and Horner Museum.

The collection was further expanded by its next curator, Dr. Joseph Leidy, who added animal specimens, fossils and anthropological samples. By the late 1880s, the collection was beginning to show signs of neglect and wear, compounded by a fire in Logan Hall, the University of Pennsylvania building that housed the museum.

Isaac Jones Wistar

Dr. Wistar's great-nephew, Isaac Jones Wistar (1827-1905), founded The Wistar Institute of Anatomy and Biology in 1892. He was a prominent Philadelphia lawyer who had argued before the U.S. Supreme Court, and risen through the ranks to brigadier general during the Civil War. Gen. Wistar made a fortune building railroads after the war and became a vice president of the Pennsylvania Railroad.

Approached by the university about making a donation toward preserving the Wistar and Horner Museum, Gen. Wistar determined to fund a new building for it himself. His vision soon expanded beyond housing the collection to create the Wistar Institute, to sponsor and publish new medical research and "any other work for the increase of original scientific knowledge." The university provided a plot of land on the west side of 36th Street, between Spruce Street and Woodland Avenue (originally designated for the University library). Wistar hired architects George W. and William G. Hewitt to design the museum/laboratory, and the building was dedicated on May 21, 1894. Dr. Horace Jayne served as its director from January 1894 to December 1903.

Gen. Wistar and his wife were childless, and he was a widower for the last decade of his life. He established an endowment of more than $1,000,000 for the institute, which generated an annual income of $30,000, as noted in his September 19, 1905 New York Times obituary. He significantly increased that endowment after death by bequeathing the bulk of his estate to the institute. Gen. Wistar was interred at the institute. In 1914, the institute posthumously published his autobiography, to which it added an addendum detailing his generosity:

After General Wistar had erected a fireproof museum and laboratory building at a cost of $125,000 on grounds presented by the University of Pennsylvania, on September 1, 1893, he created a trust fund of about $130,000 for the support of the Institute. This fund was increased from time to time by General Wistar and at the last inventory, December 1913, was valued at $236,708.
In 1897, General Wistar added a new wing to the museum building at a cost of $45,000 affording additional museum and laboratory space and a complete heating and lighting equipment.
On October 1, 1898, General Wistar established a second trust fund with securities amounting to $340,000 which in the December 1913 inventory was valued at $405,903.21.
A third fund, known as the Contingent Fund, was established by General Wistar on January 2, 1902, the income from the second trust being used for a time to build up this fund. In the December 1913 inventory, this fund was valued at $226,998.80.
In addition to these funds, General Wistar presented to the Institute improved real estate in Chicago valued at $300,000.
In his Will, General Wistar made the Wistar Institute residuary legatee to his Estate, so that after certain small annuities are extinguished the Wistar Institute will receive for its support the income on an additional estate of considerable value.
A bronze bust of Gen. Wistar by sculptor Samuel Murray is exhibited in the institute's museum. The institute's original building is a National Register of Historic Places contributing property in the University of Pennsylvania Campus Historic District. The Pennsylvania Historical and Museum Commission recognized the Wistar Institute of Anatomy and Biology with a state historic marker in 2007.

20th century

Shortly after the turn of the 20th century, The Wistar Institute began to embody Gen. Wistar's vision of a center for "new and original research" in the biological and medical sciences. Under the leadership of Milton Greenman, M.D., and Henry Donaldson, Ph.D., the institute prioritized its research into experimental and investigative biology. Helen Dean King, Ph.D., developed and bred the Wistar rat, the first standardized laboratory animal model from which more than half of all laboratory rats today are thought to be descended. The institute also gained international recognition as a training ground for young scientists thanks to the scientific journals published by the Wistar Press. Between 1905 and 1925, Wistar scientists published 227 original scientific papers. By 1925, the institute had solidified its reputation as a center of American biology.

The modern era of scientific discovery at Wistar began under the leadership of virologist and immunologist Hilary Koprowski, M.D., who served as director from 1957 to 1991. During his tenure, the institute became a leader in vaccine and cancer research. Seminal advancements in cell culture technology were also made at Wistar in that period, with the creation of the WI-38 cell line by Leonard Hayflick, Ph.D., and Paul S. Moorhead, Ph.D. This cell line was used for the development of several vaccines at the Institute and in laboratories around the world.

By the 1970s, Wistar was devoting a major part of its effort and financial resources to cancer research, and in 1972, the institute earned the designation of National Cancer Institute Cancer Center in basic research. A new Cancer Research building and a vivarium were erected in 1975.

Wistar scientists were among the first to develop antiviral and antitumor monoclonal antibodies that have been widely used as tools for basic research and to develop therapies against cancer and immune diseases. Wistar scientists have been pioneers in the study of oncogenes and the genetic basis of cancer.

21st century
The Robert and Penny Fox Research Tower, the latest addition to the Wistar research facility, opened its doors in 2014, adding nearly 90,000 square feet of cutting-edge laboratory space to the institute and allowing a more integrated style of research that reflects the "team science" discovery approach.

Notable members
 H. Fred Clark, D.V.M., Ph.D., a veterinarian and vaccine expert and worked at Wistar from 1968 to 1992. He was one of the scientists who developed the rotavirus vaccine.
 Carlo M. Croce, M.D., an oncologist noted for his research into the genetic mechanisms of cancer. During his time at Wistar from 1970 to 1988, he cloned and characterized the B-Cell lymphoma (BCL2) gene and identified chromosomal translocations involved in blood cancer.
 Peter C. Doherty, Ph.D., a veterinary surgeon and researcher in the field of medicine, has worked at the institute from 1975 to 1982 and is currently an emeritus member of the institute's Board of Trustees. Doherty received the Nobel Prize in Physiology or Medicine jointly with Rolf M. Zinkernagel (1996).
 Leonard Hayflick, Ph.D., a biologist and expert in aging who worked at Wistar from 1958 to 1968 and discovered that normal human cells divide for a limited number of times in vitro, a phenomenon known as the Hayflick limit. The WI-38 cell strain he developed at the institute with Paul S. Moorhead, Ph.D., became the substrate for the production of many human virus vaccines. 
 Helen Dean King, Ph.D., a biologist and the first woman research professor in the country. She was also the first woman scientist at Wistar and was party of the faculty from 1909 until her retirement in 1950. Her research focused on the genetics of inbreeding and sex determination. She was instrumental in the breeding of the Wistar rat, the first standardized laboratory animal model.

 Hilary Koprowski, M.D., a virologist and immunologist, and the inventor of the world's first effective live polio vaccine. He served as director of the institute from 1957 to 1991 and guided Wistar through an era of international recognition for vaccine development and cancer research. He held the title of Professor Laureate at Wistar and also served on its Board of Trustees. 
 David Kritchevsky, Ph.D., an eminent biochemist and expert in human nutrition, who worked at Wistar for five decades starting in 1957. He generated a vast amount of scientific knowledge on the role of lipids in atherosclerosis. He authored the influential textbook Cholesterol, which explored the biologic functions of cholesterol and still is the most comprehensive source of information on this subject. 
 Gerd Maul, Ph.D., a scientist and electron microscopy expert. He discovered the nuclear dots, structures within the nucleus of mammalian cells that become abundant in response to stress. He worked at Wistar from 1973 to his death in 2010.
 Ruth Patrick, Ph.D., a botanist and water environment researcher specializing in diatoms and freshwater ecology, who developed ways to measure the health of freshwater ecosystems and established a number of research facilities. Patrick served on Wistar's Board of Trustees from 1975 through 2008 and remained an emeritus member until her death.
 Stanley Plotkin, M.D., a physician, who played a pivotal role in discovery of a vaccine against the rubella virus in the 1960s while working at Wistar. Plotkin was a member of Wistar's active research faculty from 1960 to 1991. 
 Giorgio Trinchieri, M.D., an immunologist who worked at Wistar from 1979 to 1999 and served as the chairman of the Immunology Program. While at the institute, he discovered the cytokine Interleukin-12 (IL-12). He is the director of the Cancer and Inflammation Program at National Cancer Institute's Center for Cancer Research.
 Tadeusz J. Wiktor, D.V.M., a veterinarian and an authority in rabies research. He was part of Wistar's faculty from 1961 to his death in 1986 and served as the head of the institute's rabies unit. He was one of the scientists who developed the human vaccine against rabies.

References

External links
 

Independent research institutes
University of Pennsylvania campus
Medical research institutes in Pennsylvania
Wister family
University City, Philadelphia
Buildings and structures in Philadelphia
NCI-designated cancer centers
Non-profit organizations based in Philadelphia
501(c)(3) organizations